The Gala (Sumerian:  gala, Akkadian: kalû) were priests of the Sumerian goddess Inanna. They made up a significant number of the personnel of both temples and palaces, the central institutions of Mesopotamian city states.

Originally specialists in singing lamentations, gala appear in temple records dating back from the middle of the 3rd millennium BC. According to an old Babylonian text, Enki created the gala specifically to sing "heart-soothing laments" for the goddess Inanna. Cuneiform references indicate the gendered character of the role. Lamentation and wailing may have originally been female professions, so that the men who entered the role adopted its forms. Their hymns were sung in a Sumerian dialect known as eme-sal, normally used to render the speech of female gods, and some gala took female names. 

Homosexual proclivities are implied by the Sumerian proverb which reads, "When the gala wiped off his anus [he said], ‘I must not arouse that which belongs to my mistress [i.e., Inanna]’". In fact, the word gala was written using the sign sequence UŠ.KU, the first sign having also the reading giš3 ("penis"), and the second one dur2 ("anus"), meaning that might be a pun involved. Moreover, gala is homophonous with gal4-la "vulva". 

In spite of all their references of their effeminate character (especially in the Sumerian proverbs), many administrative texts mention gala priests who had children, wives, and large families. In addition, some gala priests were women.

See also
 Enaree
 Galli

Notes

References
 Al-Rawi, F. N. H. 1992. "Two Old Akkadian Letters Concerning the Offices of kala'um and närum." In Zeitschrift für Assyriologie 82.
 Bottéro, Jean, and H. Petschow. 1975. "Homosexualität." In Reallexikon der Assyriologie und Vorderasiatischen Archäologie 4:459b–468b.
 Cohen, Mark. 1974. Balag-Compositions: Sumerian lamentation liturgies of the second and first millennium B.C. Sources from the  Ancient Neat East, volume 1, fasc. 2.
 
 Gelb, I. J. 1975. "Hono ludens in early Mesopotamia." In Haec studia orientalia professort Assyriologia, et filologiae Semiticae in Universitate Helsingensi Armas I. Salonen, S.Q.A.: Anno 1975 sexagenario, 43-76. Studia Orientalia 46.
 Gordon, Edmund. 1959. Sumerian proverbs: Glimpses of everyday life in ancient Mesopotamia.
 Hartmann, Henrike. 1960. Die Musik der Sumerischen Kultur.
 Henshaw, Richard A. 1994. Male and female, the cultic personnel: The Bible and the rest of the ancient Near East. Princeton Theological Monograph Series 31.
 Kramer, Samuel N. 1981. History begins at Sumer: Thirty-nine firsts in man's recorded history. Rev. ed.
 Krecher, Joachim. 1966. Sumerische Kultlyrik.
 Lambert, Wilfried G. 1992. "Prostitution." Xenia 32:127-57.
 Michalowski, Piotr et al. (eds.). 2006. Approaches to Sumerian Literature: Studies in Honor of Stip (H. L. J. Vanstiphout).
 
 Renger, Johannes. 1969. "Untersuchungen zum Priestertum der altbabylonischen Zeit, 2. Teil." Zeitschrift zur Assyriologie 59 (n.f. 25).
 Steinkeller, Piotr. 1992. Third-millennium legal and administrative texts in the Iraq Museum, Baghdad.
 

3rd-millennium BC establishments
Mesopotamian priests
Religious occupations
Third gender
Transgender topics and religion
Ancient LGBT history
LGBT themes in mythology
Inanna